Arkansas Highway 182 (AR 182, Ark. 182, and Hwy. 182) is the designation for a state highway in the U.S. state of Arkansas. The highway itself is split into two sections, both of which are mainly located in southwest Arkansas. The first section begins at U.S. Route 70 (US 70) just east of Welsh, and ends at AR 84 in Amity. The second section begins at AR 51 in Okolona, and ends at US 67 and AR 53 in Gurdon.

Route description

Western section 
AR 182 begins at US 70 just west of the unincorporated community of Welsh. The route travels almost directly south for about  until it reaches its eastern terminus at AR 84 in Amity. The route itself does not intersect any other communities or highways, but it does cross the Caddo River shortly before its eastern terminus.

Eastern section 

AR 182 begins at AR 51 in Okolona. The route heads towards the southeast for about  before reaching its eastern terminus at the concurrency of US 67 and AR 53 in Gurdon. The route itself does not intersect any other communities or highways, however, it does travel underneath Interstate 30 but does not intersect it.

Major intersections

References

External links

182
 Transportation in Montgomery County, Arkansas
 Transportation in Clark County, Arkansas